Rafael Antonio Bournigal Pelletier (born May 12, 1966) is a Dominican former professional baseball infielder. He was drafted by the Los Angeles Dodgers of Major League Baseball (MLB) in the 19th round of the 1987 draft, and played for the Dodgers (–), Oakland Athletics (–), and Seattle Mariners. He attended Florida State University.

Bournigal's best years were with Oakland. In his three seasons with the A's he started about 36% of their games (173 out of 486), batted .249, and made a total of just 8 errors.

Career totals for 365 games include 234 hits, 4 home runs, 85 RBI, 104 runs scored, a .251 batting average, and an on-base percentage of .301. In the field, he recorded 469 putouts, 787 assists, 15 errors, and participated in 182 double plays.  His fielding percentage was an outstanding .988.

Career highlights include:
One 4-hit game...two singles, a double, and a home run vs. the Seattle Mariners (June 25, 1997)
Eleven 3-hit games...with the most impressive being a single, two doubles, three RBI, and three runs scored vs. the Detroit Tigers (April 29, 1999)

References

External links

Retrosheet

1966 births
Living people
Albuquerque Dukes players
Cañada Colts baseball players
Dominican Republic expatriate baseball players in Canada
Dominican Republic expatriate baseball players in the United States
Florida State Seminoles baseball players
Great Falls Dodgers players
Harrisburg Senators players
Los Angeles Dodgers players
Major League Baseball infielders
Major League Baseball players from the Dominican Republic
Modesto A's players
New York Mets scouts
Norfolk Tides players
Oakland Athletics players
Oklahoma RedHawks players
Ottawa Lynx players
Salem Dodgers players
San Antonio Missions players
Seattle Mariners players
Vero Beach Dodgers players